Moise de Souza is a Beninese construction engineer. He currently serves as Chacha IX, the patriarch of the aristocratic De Souza family of Ouidah.

References

Living people
Year of birth missing (living people)
Civil engineers